Ergostane is a tetracyclic triterpene, also known as 24S-methylcholestane. The compound itself has no known uses; however various functionalized analogues are produced by plants and animals. The most important of these are the heavily derivatised withanolides. However simpler forms do exist, such as the sterane campestane (24R-methylcholestane). Along with cholestane and stigmastane, this sterane is used as a biomarker for early eukaryotes.

See also
 Cholane
 Cholestane
 Lanostane

References

Triterpenes
Biomarkers
Tetracyclic compounds